Britta Thomsen (born 23 January 1954 in Aalborg) is a Danish politician who served as a Member of the European Parliament from 2004 until 2014. She is a member of the Social Democrats, which is part of the Party of European Socialists.

In parliament, Thomsen served as vice-chair of the Committee on Industry, Research and Energy. She was also a member of the Committee on Women's Rights and Gender Equality, a substitute for the Committee on Development, and vice-chair of the delegation for relations with South Africa. She supported the Manifesto of the Spinelli Group.

Career
 Scholarship, Nordic Africa Institute, Uppsala (1979)
 Studies in Portuguese language and culture, University of Lisbon (1979–1980)
 Studies in Portuguese and Spanish, Aarhus University (1980–1983)
 MA (History), Aarhus University
 Teacher and organiser of adult education (1983–1989)
 Consultant (various contracts)
 Consultant, HK (Union of Commercial and Clerical Employees in Denmark), responsible for international projects and surveys in the tourism and service industries (1994–2000)
 Director and owner of Facilitate (consultancy), working with labour market issues at European level (2001–2004)
 With the Danish Social Democrats
 Member of the party programme committee (2000)
 Publications: articles about Portugal in various Danish magazines

External links
 Official website
 
 

1954 births
Living people
People associated with renewable energy
Politicians from Aalborg
Social Democrats (Denmark) MEPs
Socialist feminists
MEPs for Denmark 2009–2014
MEPs for Denmark 2004–2009
21st-century women MEPs for Denmark